30thAnnie Awards
February 1, 2003

Best Feature Film: 
Spirited Away

Best Television Program: 
The Simpsons

Best Home Video Production: 
Rolie Polie Olie: The Great Defender of Fun

Best Short Subject: 
''The Tortoise and the Hare

The 30th Annual Annie Awards honoring excellence in the field of animation of 2002 were held on February 1, 2003, in California, USA.

Production nominees

Outstanding individual achievements

References

Annie Awards ceremonies
2002 film awards
Annie Awards
Annie
Recurring events